Johannes Swedborg, (5 July 1824 – 16 June 1888) was a Swedish professor of classical languages and newspaper publisher.

Biography
Swedborg grew up in a poor home in Skara in Västra Götaland County, Sweden  where he attended  the Skara skola. The studies he financed by working as a private teacher in his spare time. 
At the age of 23 in 1847, he entered Uppsala University where he earned a bachelor's degree in 1856 and received his master's degree in 1857 following his dissertation  De diis Romanorum penatibus. Three years later he presented second dissertation De Claudii Claudiani quod de raptu Proserpinae inscribitur carmine epico quaestiones and was appointed associate professor of Latin at Uppsala University.

He left Uppsala in 1862 and moved to Vänersborg. He had received a position as a lecturer in Latin, Greek, history and geography at the city's higher education and would remain in this position for the remainder of his professional life. In 1866, he became a newspaper publisher in Vänersborg  when he launched the newspaper Wenersborgs-Posten of which he was also the editor-in-chief. The paper was published twice weekly until 1872.

Personal life
Swedborg was married to Sofia Amalia Ramstedt (1836–1919) with whom he had sons Anders (1863–1889), Herman Swedborg (1865–1926) and Ernst (1867–1934).
He died during 1888 in Vänersborg.

References

1824 births
1888 deaths
People from Skara Municipality
Uppsala University alumni
Academic staff of Uppsala University
Swedish educators
Swedish newspaper publishers (people)